Adrian Mannarino was the defending champion, but lost in the first round to Michał Przysiężny.
Andreas Seppi won the title, defeating Julien Benneteau 2–6, 6–3, 7–6(7–4) in the final.

Seeds

Draw

Finals

Top half

Bottom half

References
 Main Draw
 Qualifying Draw

Ethias Trophy - Singles
2011 Ethias Trophy